The Lilydale to Warburton Rail Trail (also known as the Warburton Trail) is a walking, cycling and horse-riding track in eastern Victoria, Australia.  It runs a distance of 38 km between Lilydale and Warburton, along the former Warburton railway line. A section between Corduroy Road in Yarra Junction and Warburton is also known as the Centenary Trail.

The trail begins at Lilydale and passes through the townships of Mount Evelyn, Wandin Nth, Seville, Seville East, Woori Yallock, Launching Place, Yarra Junction, Wesburn and Millgrove, ending at Warburton.

History 
Since the closure of the Warburton railway line in July 1965 and the dismantling of the track in the early 1970's, the land had remained vacant. In 1984 and again in 1996 the state government investigated selling off the land, but withdrew these proposals in part due to community opposition.

Since its establishment in 1996 the trail has been continually developed and maintained by a combination of local volunteers, particularly the Friends of the Lilydale to Warburton Rail Trail, as well the Local Council and State and Federal governments. Over several years a significant amount of effort went into clearing the land, restoring 13 bridges and surfacing of the trail. Negotiations were undertaken with neighbouring farmers who had previously occupied the reserve to erect fencing and gates where necessary.

By 1998 the trail was continuous from Maroondah Highway, Lilydale to the site of the former Warburton station, with only a relatively short section between Lilydale Station and Maroondah Highway remaining incomplete.

The remaining section of the trail, a bridge across the Maroondah Highway, was completed in early 2011. The next stage of improvements to the trail is a crossing at York Road in Mount Evelyn, which should be completed mid-2011.

Deviation 
Although the trail is continuous from Lilydale to Warburton, it does not completely adhere to the former Warburton rail line's alignment. Some  from Lilydale station, just before a historic bridge where the original alignment of Anderson Street passed over the railway, the trail deviates around the north, east and south of Mount Lilydale Mercy College. The school currently leases the land formerly occupied by the railway, which connects the old school grounds south-west of the line with an extension on the north-east. The southern end of the deviation rises to meet the original alignment of the trail at a steep grade that makes it unsuitable for wheelchairs.

Gallery

See also 
 Bicycle Trails in Victoria

References

Further reading
 Bike Paths Victoria 9th ed. (2014), Sabey & Assoc. Pty Ltd., pp66 – 74,

External links 
 Rail Trails Australia's Lilydale to Warburton Rail Trail Page
 Visit Victoria's Warburton Trail page
 
Historical Train Photos of Warburton D3 639; Electric E 1106 - WarburtonInfo.com
 

Rail trails in Victoria (Australia)
Proposed bridges in Australia
Yarra Valley
Transport in the Shire of Yarra Ranges